Richard Erdman (born May 20, 1952) is an American artist living and working in Williston, Vermont, and Carrara, Italy. Primarily working in marble and bronze abstract sculpture, Erdman's prolific body of work ranges from intimately sized maquettes to the largest sculpture ever carved from a single block of travertine (Passage, in the collection of the Donald M. Kendall Sculpture Gardens). His works belong to collections in 52 countries across 6 continents, including the United Nations, Museum of Fine Arts, Boston, Princeton University, the Rockefeller Collection, and many others. Erdman specializes in collaborating with esteemed architectural firms for custom commissions, and has partnered with Antonio Citterio, Richard Meier & Partners, Enzo Enea, and Whipple Russell, among others.

Erdman's family moved to Dorset, Vermont, when he was a child, where he grew up at the foothills of the oldest marble quarries in the U.S. These early experiences with stone and nature greatly influenced his life and work. In his youth, Erdman was a two-time NCAA All-American skier at the University of Vermont. Erdman is the grandson of Charles R. Erdman Jr., former mayor of Princeton.

Education
 Burr and Burton Academy, 1971.
 University of Vermont, 1975.
 Honorary Doctorate of Letters, University of Vermont, 2016.

Career
Richard Erdman has travelled to the marble quarries of Carrara, Italy, since 1975. His sculpture is frequently made from the region's white and grey marbles, which have been used since the time of Ancient Rome as the source material for a long lineage of artists, including Michelangelo. His sculptures merge the ancient tradition of marble stone-carving with contemporary modernist sculpture, and have been shown in more than 160 solo and group exhibitions throughout North America, Europe, and Asia.  He has executed over 120 commissioned works for museums, public, and corporate collections. His work is held in collections in 52 countries worldwide.

In 1985 PepsiCo commissioned Erdman to create the monumental sculpture Passage, which stands like a sentinel at the entrance to the Donald M. Kendall Sculpture Gardens at PepsiCo.  Carved from a massive 450 ton block of travertine, the 25-by-16 foot Passage is the largest sculpture in the world carved from a single block of travertine. More recently, in 2017, Richard Erdman completed the monumental Bardiglio marble sculpture Arete, for Richard Meier & Partners' Timeless 55 Tower located in Taipei, Taiwan. Arete stands nearly 12 feet high.

Gallery Representation
 375 Gallery, Palm Beach, FL
 Enea Tree Museum, Rapperswil- Jona, Switzerland
 Galerie d' Orsay, Boston, MA
 Galerie Artziwna, Vienna, Austria
 Landau Contemporary at Galerie Dominion, Montreal, QC, Canada
 Landau Fine Art, Meggen, Switzerland
 Melissa Morgan Fine Art, Palm Desert, CA
 Sculpturesite Gallery, Glen Ellen, CA
 Westbranch Gallery and Sculpture Park, Stowe, VT

Major collections
 Aldrich Museum of Contemporary Art, Ridgefield, CT
 Allentown Art Museum, Allentown, PA
 Carpathian Foundation, Kosice, Slovakia
 Charles Stewart Mott Foundation, Flint, MI
 Dolly Fiterman Fine Arts, Minneapolis, MN
 Donald M. Kendall Sculpture Gardens at PepsiCo, Purchase, NY
 EastWest Institute, New York, Prague, Moscow, Brussels
 EcoLean International A/S, Sweden
 Enea Tree Museum, Rapperswil-Jona, Switzerland
 Four Seasons Hotel, St. Louis, MO
 Four Seasons Hotel, Singapore
 Four Seasons Park, Singapore
 Georgia Institute of Technology, Atlanta, GA
 Green Mountain Valley School, Waitsfield, VT
 Herbert F. Johnson Museum of Art, Cornell University, Ithaca, NY
 John E. Fetzer Center, Kalamazoo, MI
 JP Morgan Chase, New York, NY
 King Faisal Foundation, Riyadh, Saudi Arabia
 Lumiere Place, St. Louis, MO
 Marriott Hotel, Burlington, VT
 MGM Grand, Detroit, MI
 Minneapolis Institute of Art, Minneapolis, MN
 Museum of Fine Arts, Boston, MA
 Norton Museum of Art, Palm Beach, FL
 Princeton University Art Museum, Princeton, NJ
 Ringling College of Art and Design, Sarasota, FL
 Fleming Museum of Art, Burlington, VT
 Rockefeller Collection, New York, NY
 Sasak Peace Foundation, Tokyo, Japan
 Seven Bridges Foundation, Greenwich, CT
 Shelby Cullom Davis Foundation, Bethesda, MD
 Southern Vermont Arts Center, Manchester, VT
 Stratton Educational Foundation, Stratton Mountain, VT
 Tel Aviv Museum of Art, Tel Aviv, Israel
 The Menninger Foundation, Topeka, KS
 United Nations, New York, NY
 United States Olympic Foundation, Stowe, VT
 University of St. Thomas (Minnesota), St. Paul, MN
 University of Vermont, Burlington, VT
 Valley Hospital, Ridgewood, NJ
 Weintraub Sculpture Garden, Tel Aviv, Israel
 Kunsthalle Weishaupt, Ulm, Germany

References

Herrin, Alice and Tavakoli,Brenda."A Portfolio of Sculptors", Southwest Art, Santa Fe, July 1, 2001. Retrieved on August 23, 2010
Frank, Peter(2008). Richard Erdman, . Skylark Press, Los Angeles. .
Weaver, Thomas. "Carving Artist",  Vermont Quarterly, Burlington, July 1, 2003. Retrieved on August 23, 2010
Dorfman, John."Set in Stone",Art and Antiques Magazine, December 1, 2016. Retrieved on December 1, 2017

External links
 Official web site
 Artziwna gallery
 Galerie d'Orsay 
  Richard Meier and Partners "CDC 55 Timeless Xin-Yi Residential Tower"
 Landau Fine Art

1952 births
People from Princeton, New Jersey
University of Vermont alumni
Vermont Catamounts skiers
20th-century American sculptors
Living people
Artists from Vermont
21st-century American sculptors
21st-century American male artists
American male sculptors
Sculptors from New Jersey
20th-century American male artists